Wholly Moses! is a 1980 American Biblical spoof film written by Guy Thomas and directed by Gary Weis. Dudley Moore plays Old Testament-era idol maker Herschel, whose life and adventures seem to parallel that of the more famous Moses, all the while being misled to think he is the prophet of God. The film also stars Laraine Newman, James Coco, Paul Sand, Jack Gilford, Dom DeLuise, John Houseman, Madeline Kahn, David Lander, Richard Pryor, and John Ritter.

Plot
Harvey and Zoey, two tourists travelling through Israel, discover an ancient scroll describing the life of Herschel, the man who was almost Moses. Herschel thinks he hears God commanding him to go to Egypt, but actually, he has overheard God giving His instructions to Moses at the burning bush. He tries to obey this command, but Moses always seems to be one step ahead of him. Several other biblical stories, such as Lot and his wife, David and Goliath, and the miracles of Jesus, are also parodied in this story of the life of a man trying to follow the path to God, but somehow always seeming to lose his way.

Cast
 Dudley Moore .... Harvey Orchid/Herschel
 Laraine Newman .... Zoey/Zerelda
 James Coco .... Hyssop
 Paul Sand .... God's Angel
 Jack Gilford .... Tailor
 Dom DeLuise .... Shadrach
 John Houseman .... The Archangel
 Madeline Kahn .... The Witch
 David L. Lander .... The Beggar
 Richard Pryor .... Pharaoh
 John Ritter .... The Devil
 Richard B. Shull .... Jethro
 Tanya Boyd .... Princess
 Ruth Manning .... Landlady
 Walker Edmiston .... God (voice)

Reception
The film received poor reviews.

Because of a production hiatus imposed on their television show by WTTW, Roger Ebert and Gene Siskel did not review the film on Sneak Previews upon its initial release. Of the film, Ebert wrote in print: 

In another print review, Siskel wrote: 

When the film was released on DVD, John Sinnott of DVD Talk echoed Siskel's comparisons: 

In a guest review for Entertainment Weekly regarding the same DVD release, and that of another film starring Moore, Crazy People, Ty Burr of The Boston Globe gave the film a D grade, describing the film as a "wholly unfunny comedy".

Five orthodox Jewish groups protested the film for mocking their religion.

Wholly Moses holds a 14% rating on Rotten Tomatoes based on seven reviews.

References

External links 
 
 
 

1980 films
1980 comedy films
1980s parody films
American comedy films
Columbia Pictures films
Films scored by Patrick Williams
Films set in ancient Egypt
Religious comedy films
Films directed by Gary Weis
Portrayals of Moses in film
1980s English-language films
1980s American films